Lake Lasva is a lake of Estonia.

See also
List of lakes of Estonia

Lasva
Võru Parish
Lasva